Harvey Warren Zorbaugh (September 20, 1896 – January 21, 1965) was Professor of Educational Sociology, at New York University. he was born in East Cleveland, Ohio and educated in sociology at the University of Chicago. He married Geraldine Elizabeth Bone on September 7, 1929, and they had two children: a son, Harvey Jr., and a daughter, Harriet. His classic text, first published in 1929, was The Gold Coast and the Slum, a book based on his PhD thesis completed under the direction of Robert E. Park at the University of Chicago.

In the late 1940s, Dr. Zorbaugh also hosted one of the first game shows on American TV. Titled Play the Game, the show aired from September 24, 1946 to December 17, 1946 (DuMont, primetime) and from August 20, 1948 to November 6, 1948 (ABC, primetime).

Also during the 1940s, he published some sociological comments about the comic book craze then prevalent among young Americans.

"It is time the amazing cultural phenomenon of the growth of the comics is subjected to dispassionate scrutiny. Somewhere between vituperation and complacency must be found a road to the understanding and use of this great new medium of communication and social influence. For the comics are here to stay."

Zorbaugh's primary interest in urban sociology concerned the causes and effects of social and geographical segregation within the city and the issues created by the tensions between the need for social and community cohesion and those boundaries that inevitably emerge between different social groups rooted in geography, race and economic status. Consequently, he was interested in the fluid changes in city life and how any boundaries we see are always transient, unstable and changing. He spent the bulk of his career on the faculty of New York University becoming a leading specialist in the social adjustment of gifted children. He worked with clinics, committees and other public services around the problems of children and was an outspoken opponent of racial prejudice in public schools.

Publications
1926: The Natural Areas of the City
1929: The Gold Coast and the Slum: A Sociological Study of Chicago's Near North Side, Chicago: The University of Chicago Press
1951: Steel! edited by Harvey Zorbough; story by Frank Kolars; produced by Johnstone and Cushing. Information Rack Service, General Motors Personnel Staff, 1951, 16pp: col. ill; Caption title: Jimmy gets his story.
1956: Steel! edited by Harvey Zorbaugh; story by Frank Kolars. 2nd revision. New York: American Iron and Steel Institute, 1956. 16 pp.: col. ill. Caption title: Jimmy Gets His Story. Educational giveaway comic book on the steel industry.
1960: The Empire State Audio tape of educational television program presented by the Board of Education - Garden City, New York, February 24, 1960. Thoreau Society, Lincoln, Mass

Papers and articles
 The Dweller in Furnished Rooms: an Urban Type, Papers and Proceedings of the American Sociological Association, 1925
 The Urban Community, 1926, Chicago University Press
 Topical Summaries of Current Literature, Educational Sociology, American Journal of Sociology, 1927 - University of Chicago Press
 Research in Educational Sociology, Journal of Educational Sociology, 1927
 Educational Sociology, American Journal of Sociology, 1927
 Personality and Social Adjustment, Journal of Educational Sociology, 1928
 Mental Hygiene's Challenge to Education, Journal of Educational Sociology, 1932
 Adolescence: Psychosis or Social Adjustment? Journal of Educational Sociology, 1935
1935: Sex Education, The Journal of Educational Sociology: February 1935, New York: The Journal of Educational Sociology
 Salvaging Our Gifted Children, Journal of Educational Sociology, 1936
 Sociology in the Clinic, Journal of Educational Sociology, 1939
 The Comics as an Educational Medium, 1944 - The Payne Educational Sociology
 with Mildred Gilman, What Can YOU do about Comic Books? Journal of Education, 12, 1944, pp. 14–15
 The Comics—There They Stand! Journal of Educational Sociology, Vol. 18, Nr. 4 (December 1944), pp. 196–203
 Are You Throttling a Future President? The American Magazine, Dec 1945
 What Can You do about Comic Books? Family Circle, Feb 1949, pp. 61–63
 What adults think of comics as reading for children. Journal of Educational Sociology, Vol. 23, No. 4, (Dec., 1949), pp. 225–235
 Some Observations of Highly Gifted Children, with RK Boardman in The Gifted Child, (Edited by Paul A. Witty.), 1951
 Television–Technological Revolution in Education, Journal of Educational Sociology, 1958
 Closed-circuit Television as a Medium of Instruction at New York University, 1956-1957: A Report on New York University's Second Year of Experimentation, HL Klapper, TC Pollock, HW Zorbaugh, New York The University, 1958

See also
 Chicago school (sociology)
 Comics
 Intellectual giftedness

References

University of Chicago alumni
New York University faculty
American sociologists
1896 births
1965 deaths